Intelsat 706 (also known as IS-706 and Intelsat 7-F6) is a geostationary communication satellite that was built by Space Systems/Loral (SSL). It is located in the orbital position of 157 degrees east longitude and it is currently in an inclined orbit. The same is owned by Intelsat. The satellite was based on the LS-1300 platform and its estimated useful life was 15 years.

The satellite was successfully launched into space on May 17, 1995, at 06:34, using an Ariane 4 vehicle from the Guiana Space Centre, Kourou, French Guiana. It had a launch mass of 4,180 kg.

The Intelsat 706 is equipped with 26 transponders in C band and 10 in Ku band to provide broadcasting, business-to-home services and telecommunications. It was positioned over the Atlantic Ocean and has the transponder capacity to relay 110,000 telephone calls simultaneously.

Specifications 
 Payload power: 3612 W
 Power: Equinox: 5326 W, Solstice: 4884 W
 Stabilization: 3-axis
 Solar array: 25.7 m span
 Propulsion: R-4D-11

Location in orbit 
 56° W (May 1995 - June 1995)	
 53° W (July 1995 - September 2004)	
 50.25° E (October 2004 - April 2009)	
 54.85° E (April 2009 - July 2010)	
 72.1° E (August 2010 - October 2011)	
 72.1° E inclined (October 2011 - August 2012)	
 157° E inclined (February 2013 - November 2014)

Transponders 
 Mass of the transponders: 
 Mass of the antennas: 

 C band
 Power: 10, 20 and 30 W
 Bandwidth: 10 transponders of 36 MHz, 2 transponders of 41 MHz and 16 transponders of 72 MHz
 EIRP: Global beam (36 & 41 MHz): 29 dBW / Hemispheric beam (8x72 MHz & 2x36 MHz): 33 dBW / Zone beam (8x72 MHz & 2x36 MHz): 33 dBW / Spot beam (36 & 41 MHz): 36.1 dBW
Polarization: circular R/L

 
 Power: 5 transponders of 49 W and 5 transponders of 73 W
 Bandwidth: 6 transponders of 72 MHz and 8 transponders of 112 MHz
 EIRP: Spot 1: 47 dBW, Spot 2: 47 dBW and Spot 3: 42.8 dBW
 Polarization: linear
 Frequency: Downlink 10.95 GHz - 11.20 GHz, 11.45 GHz - 11.70 GHz, 11.70 GHz - 11.95 GHz and 12.50 GHz - 12.75 GHz

See also

 1995 in spaceflight

External links 
 Intelsat 706 TBS satellite
 Intelsat 706 SatBeams

References 

Spacecraft launched in 1995
Intelsat satellites